The 1992 Copa CONMEBOL was the first edition of CONMEBOL's annual club tournament. Teams that failed to qualify for the Copa Libertadores played in this tournament. Sixteen teams from the ten South American football confederations qualified for this tournament. Atlético Mineiro defeated Olimpia in the finals.

Qualified teams

Bracket

First round

|}

Quarterfinals

|}

Semifinals

|}

Finals

|}

External links
CONMEBOL 1992 at RSSSF
CONMEBOL 1992 at CONMEBOL Official Website

Copa CONMEBOL
3